The Six Days of Amsterdam is a six-day track cycling race held at the Amsterdam Velodrome in Amsterdam, the Netherlands.

The recordholder for the Six Days of Amsterdam is the Dutch cyclist Danny Stam with four victories.

The most recent edition took place in 2016 and was won by Belgians Kenny De Ketele and Moreno De Pauw, their third Six Day victory as a duo.

History
The first edition was between 18 and 24 November 1932, in the old building of the Amsterdam RAI on the Ferdinand Bolstraat on a 166.6 metre track. This first edition was won by the Dutch couple Jan Pijnenburg and Piet van Kempen. The year afterwards the Dutch couple Jan Pijnenburg/Cor Wals beat  the French couple Marcel Guimbretiere/Paul Broccado and the year later during the third edition it was the other way around and the French couple won. After Adolphe Charlier and Frans Slaats won the fourth edition in 1936 there were no more Six Days held in Amsterdam for thirty years. Due to the large unemployment and later also due to the second world war, the National Cycling Union (NWU) prohibited to organise Six Day races. There were many proposals to organise a Six Day race after the second world war but the fifth edition was years later in 1966, in the new RAI building located on the Europaplein. After four editions in this building there were again about thirty years without the event organised in Amsterdam. Since 2001 the race takes place in the new build Amsterdam Velodrome located in Sportpark Sloten, with a 200-metre track and a capacity for 2000 spectators. World Champion Ellen van Dijk fired the starting shot for the 21st edition in October 2013.

List of winning teams of the Six Days of Amsterdam

Source

See also

 Six Days of Ghent
 Six Days of Grenoble
 Six Days of New York

References

External links

 
 

Sports competitions in Amsterdam
Cycle races in the Netherlands
Recurring sporting events established in 1932
1932 establishments in the Netherlands
Six-day races
Articles containing video clips
Six Day Series